Air Vice-Marshal William Edward Theak,  (1898 – 28 January 1955) was a First World War pilot in the Royal Flying Corps and a senior officer in the Royal Air Force during the Second World War and the post war decade.

In 1940, Theak was appointed as the chief signals officer at the headquarters of Bomber Command. In February 1944, he was promoted to air vice-marshal and given command of No. 60 (Signals) Group.

After the war Theak was made the director-general of signals at the Air Ministry. In 1949 he took up post as the air officer administration at the headquarters of the Middle East Air Force. In 1951 he returned to Great Britain to serve as Air Officer Commanding No. 90 (Signals) Group. He retired in March 1954 and died the following year.

External links
Air of Authority – A History of RAF Organisation – Air Vice-Marshal W E Theak

|-

1898 births
1955 deaths
British World War I pilots
Commanders of the Order of the British Empire
Companions of the Order of the Bath
Royal Air Force air marshals of World War II
Royal Flying Corps officers
London Regiment soldiers
Military personnel from London